Edward Charles Herring ( – 1928), known on the stage as Charles Harbury  was an English-born stage actor with a long list of Broadway support and or character credits. He appeared in productions starring E. H. Sothern, Virginia Harned, Ethel Barrymore and Mrs. Fiske to name a few. He died in upstate New York and was buried in a charity plot at Kensico Cemetery.

Selected stage productions
Captain Lettarblair (1892)
The Manoeuvres of Jane (1899-1900) (with Mary Mannering) 
When Knighthood Was in Flower (1901) (with Julia Marlowe)
Sunday (1904) (w/Ethel Barrymore)
The World and His Wife (1908)
Mrs. Bumpstead-Leigh (1911) (with Mrs. Fiske)
The Return from Jerusalem (1912)
Oliver Twist (1912) (with Marie Doro, Constance Collier)
Three Faces East (1918)
Launcelot and Elaine (1921)
The Merchant of Venice (1922–23) (with David Warfield)

References

External links

1843 births
1928 deaths
Burials at Kensico Cemetery
19th-century American actors
20th-century American actors